First-seeded Maria Bueno defeated Christine Truman 6–1, 6–4 in the final to win the women's singles tennis title at the 1959 U.S. National Championships.

This was notably the first grand slam that former world number 1 and 12 time grand slam champion Billie Jean King competed in.

Seeds
The seeded players are listed below. Maria Bueno is the champion; others show in brackets the round in which they were eliminated.

  Maria Bueno (champion)
  Sandra Reynolds (quarterfinals)
  Christine Truman (finalist)
  Darlene Hard (semifinals)
  Angela Mortimer (second round)
  Ann Haydon (semifinals)
  Renée Schuurman (second round)
  Sally Moore (third round)

Draw

Key
 Q = Qualifier
 WC = Wild card
 LL = Lucky loser
 r = Retired

Final eight

References

1959
1959 in women's tennis
1959 in American women's sports
Women's Singles